Heterohelicoidea is a superfamily of middle Jurassic to Oligocene planktonic forams characterized by biserial or triserial tests, at least in the early stage, that may be reduced in the later stage but more commonly show chamber proliferation in the later stage. Aperture a low or high arch at the base of the final chamber or terminal in uniserial stage. Heterohelicoidea contains one family, the Heterohelicidae.

References

 Loeblich, A.R. Jr and H. Tappan 1988. Foraminiferal Genera and their Classification. Van Nostrand Reinhold

External links
Foraminiferida

Foraminifera superfamilies
Globigerinina